Carbon dioxide (chemical formula ) is a chemical compound made up of molecules that each have one carbon atom covalently double bonded to two oxygen atoms. It is found in the gas state at room temperature. In the air, carbon dioxide is transparent to visible light but absorbs infrared radiation, acting as a greenhouse gas. It is a trace gas in Earth's atmosphere at 421 parts per million (ppm), or about 0.04% by volume (as of May 2022), having risen from pre-industrial levels of 280 ppm. Burning fossil fuels is the primary cause of these increased CO2 concentrations and also the primary cause of climate change. Carbon dioxide is soluble in water and is found in groundwater, lakes, ice caps, and seawater. When carbon dioxide dissolves in water, it forms carbonate and mainly bicarbonate, which causes ocean acidification as atmospheric CO2 levels increase.

As the source of available carbon in the carbon cycle, atmospheric CO2 is the primary carbon source for life on Earth. Its concentration in Earth's pre-industrial atmosphere since late in the Precambrian has been regulated by organisms and geological phenomena. Plants, algae and cyanobacteria use energy from sunlight to synthesize carbohydrates from carbon dioxide and water in a process called photosynthesis, which produces oxygen as a waste product. In turn, oxygen is consumed and CO2 is released as waste by all aerobic organisms when they metabolize organic compounds to produce energy by respiration. CO2 is released from organic materials when they decay or combust, such as in forest fires. Since plants require CO2 for photosynthesis, and humans and animals depend on plants for food, CO2 is necessary for the survival of life on earth.

Carbon dioxide is 53% more dense than dry air, but is long lived and thoroughly mixes in the atmosphere. About half of excess CO2 emissions to the atmosphere are absorbed by land and ocean carbon sinks. These sinks can become saturated and are volatile, as decay and wildfires result in the CO2 being released back into the atmosphere. CO2 is eventually sequestered (stored for the long term) in rocks and organic deposits like coal, petroleum and natural gas. Sequestered CO2 is released into the atmosphere through burning fossil fuels or naturally by volcanoes, hot springs, geysers, and when carbonate rocks dissolve in water or react with acids.

CO2 is a versatile industrial material, used, for example, as an inert gas in welding and fire extinguishers, as a pressurizing gas in air guns and oil recovery, and as a supercritical fluid solvent in decaffeination of coffee and supercritical drying.  It is a byproduct of fermentation of sugars in bread, beer and wine making, and is added to carbonated beverages like seltzer and beer for effervescence. It has a sharp and acidic odor and generates the taste of soda water in the mouth, but at normally encountered concentrations it is odorless.

Chemical and physical properties

Structure, bonding and molecular vibrations 

The symmetry of a carbon dioxide molecule is linear and centrosymmetric at its equilibrium geometry. The length of the carbon-oxygen bond in carbon dioxide is 116.3 pm, noticeably shorter than the roughly 140-pm length of a typical single C–O bond, and shorter than most other C–O multiply-bonded functional groups such as carbonyls. Since it is centrosymmetric, the molecule has no electric dipole moment.

As a linear triatomic molecule,  has four vibrational modes as shown in the diagram. In the symmetric and the antisymmetric stretching modes, the atoms move along the axis of the molecule. There are two bending modes, which are degenerate, meaning that they have the same frequency and same energy, because of the symmetry of the molecule. When a molecule touches a surface or touches another molecule, the two bending modes can differ in frequency because the interaction is different for the two modes. Some of the vibrational modes are observed in the infrared (IR) spectrum: the antisymmetric stretching mode at wavenumber 2349 cm−1 (wavelength 4.25 μm) and the degenerate pair of bending modes at 667 cm−1 (wavelength 15 μm). The symmetric stretching mode does not create an electric dipole so is not observed in IR spectroscopy, but it is detected in by Raman spectroscopy at 1388 cm−1 (wavelength 7.2 μm).

In the gas phase, carbon dioxide molecules undergo significant vibrational motions and do not keep a fixed structure. However, in a Coulomb explosion imaging experiment, an instantaneous image of the molecular structure can be deduced. Such an experiment has been performed for carbon dioxide.
The result of this experiment, and the conclusion of theoretical calculations based on an ab initio potential energy surface of the molecule, is that none of the 
molecules in the gas phase are ever exactly linear. This counter-intuitive result is trivially due to 
the fact that the nuclear motion volume element vanishes for linear geometries.
This is so for all molecules (except diatomics!).

In aqueous solution 

Carbon dioxide is soluble in water, in which it reversibly forms  (carbonic acid), which is a weak acid since its ionization in water is incomplete.
CO2 + H2O <=> H2CO3

The hydration equilibrium constant of carbonic acid is, at 25 °C:

Hence, the majority of the carbon dioxide is not converted into carbonic acid, but remains as  molecules, not affecting the pH.

As shown in a Bjerrum plot, in neutral or slightly alkaline water (pH > 6.5), the bicarbonate form predominates (>50%) becoming the most prevalent (>95%) at the pH of seawater. In very alkaline water (pH > 10.4), the predominant (>50%) form is carbonate. The oceans, being mildly alkaline with typical pH = 8.2–8.5, contain about 120 mg of bicarbonate per liter.

Being diprotic, carbonic acid has two acid dissociation constants, the first one for the dissociation into the bicarbonate (also called hydrogen carbonate) ion:

H2CO3 <=> HCO3- + H+
Ka1 = ; pKa1 = 3.6 at 25 °C.
This is the true first acid dissociation constant, defined as

where the denominator includes only covalently bound  and does not include hydrated . The much smaller and often-quoted value near  is an apparent value calculated on the (incorrect) assumption that all dissolved  is present as carbonic acid, so that 

Since most of the dissolved remains as  molecules, Ka1(apparent) has a much larger denominator and a much smaller value than the true Ka1.

The bicarbonate ion is an amphoteric species that can act as an acid or as a base, depending on pH of the solution. At high pH, it dissociates significantly into the carbonate ion:
HCO3- <=> CO3^2- + H+
Ka2 = ; pKa2 = 10.329

In organisms carbonic acid production is catalysed by the enzyme, carbonic anhydrase.

Chemical reactions of CO2 
 is a potent electrophile having an electrophilic reactivity that is comparable to benzaldehyde or strong α,β-unsaturated carbonyl compounds.
MR  +  CO2  ->   RCO2M
where M = Li or Mg Br and R = alkyl or aryl.

CO2 +  2 e- +  2H+ ->  CO  +  H2O

Photoautotrophs (i.e. plants and cyanobacteria) use the energy contained in sunlight to photosynthesize simple sugars from  absorbed from the air and water:
 \mathit{n}CO2{} + \mathit{n}H2O -> (CH2O)_\mathit{n}{} + \mathit{n}O2

The redox potential for this reaction near pH 7 is about −0.53 V versus the standard hydrogen electrode. The nickel-containing enzyme carbon monoxide dehydrogenase catalyses this process.

Physical properties 

Carbon dioxide is colorless. At low concentrations the gas is odorless; however, at sufficiently high concentrations, it has a sharp, acidic odor. At standard temperature and pressure, the density of carbon dioxide is around 1.98 kg/m3, about 1.53 times that of air.

Carbon dioxide has no liquid state at pressures below . At a pressure of 1 atm, the gas deposits directly to a solid at temperatures below  and the solid sublimes directly to a gas above this temperature. In its solid state, carbon dioxide is commonly called dry ice.

Another form of solid carbon dioxide observed at high pressure is an amorphous glass-like solid. This form of glass, called carbonia, is produced by supercooling heated  at extreme pressures (40–48 GPa, or about 400,000 atmospheres) in a diamond anvil. This discovery confirmed the theory that carbon dioxide could exist in a glass state similar to other members of its elemental family, like silicon dioxide (silica glass) and germanium dioxide. Unlike silica and germania glasses, however, carbonia glass is not stable at normal pressures and reverts to gas when pressure is released.

At temperatures and pressures above the critical point, carbon dioxide behaves as a supercritical fluid known as supercritical carbon dioxide.

Table of thermal and physical properties of saturated liquid carbon dioxide:

Table of thermal and physical properties of carbon dioxide at atmospheric pressure:

Biological role 
Carbon dioxide is an end product of cellular respiration in organisms that obtain energy by breaking down sugars, fats and amino acids with oxygen as part of their metabolism. This includes all plants, algae and animals and aerobic fungi and bacteria. In vertebrates, the carbon dioxide travels in the blood from the body's tissues to the skin (e.g., amphibians) or the gills (e.g., fish), from where it dissolves in the water, or to the lungs from where it is exhaled. During active photosynthesis, plants can absorb more carbon dioxide from the atmosphere than they release in respiration.

Photosynthesis and carbon fixation 

Carbon fixation is a biochemical process by which atmospheric carbon dioxide is incorporated by plants, algae and (cyanobacteria) into energy-rich organic molecules such as glucose, thus creating their own food by photosynthesis. Photosynthesis uses carbon dioxide and water to produce sugars from which other organic compounds can be constructed, and oxygen is produced as a by-product.

Ribulose-1,5-bisphosphate carboxylase oxygenase, commonly abbreviated to RuBisCO, is the enzyme involved in the first major step of carbon fixation, the production of two molecules of 3-phosphoglycerate from CO2 and ribulose bisphosphate, as shown in the diagram at left.

RuBisCO is thought to be the single most abundant protein on Earth.

Phototrophs use the products of their photosynthesis as internal food sources and as raw material for the biosynthesis of more complex organic molecules, such as polysaccharides, nucleic acids and proteins. These are used for their own growth, and also as the basis of the food chains and webs that feed other organisms, including animals such as ourselves. Some important phototrophs, the coccolithophores synthesise hard calcium carbonate scales. A globally significant species of coccolithophore is Emiliania huxleyi whose calcite scales have formed the basis of many sedimentary rocks such as limestone, where what was previously atmospheric carbon can remain fixed for geological timescales.

Plants can grow as much as 50 percent faster in concentrations of 1,000 ppm CO2 when compared with ambient conditions, though this assumes no change in climate and no limitation on other nutrients. Elevated CO2 levels cause increased growth reflected in the harvestable yield of crops, with wheat, rice and soybean all showing increases in yield of 12–14% under elevated CO2 in FACE experiments.

Increased atmospheric CO2 concentrations result in fewer stomata developing on plants which leads to reduced water usage and increased water-use efficiency. Studies using FACE have shown that CO2 enrichment leads to decreased concentrations of micronutrients in crop plants. This may have knock-on effects on other parts of ecosystems as herbivores will need to eat more food to gain the same amount of protein.

The concentration of secondary metabolites such as phenylpropanoids and flavonoids can also be altered in plants exposed to high concentrations of CO2.

Plants also emit CO2 during respiration, and so the majority of plants and algae, which use C3 photosynthesis, are only net absorbers during the day. Though a growing forest will absorb many tons of CO2 each year, a mature forest will produce as much CO2 from respiration and decomposition of dead specimens (e.g., fallen branches) as is used in photosynthesis in growing plants. Contrary to the long-standing view that they are carbon neutral, mature forests can continue to accumulate carbon and remain valuable carbon sinks, helping to maintain the carbon balance of Earth's atmosphere. Additionally, and crucially to life on earth, photosynthesis by phytoplankton consumes dissolved CO2 in the upper ocean and thereby promotes the absorption of CO2 from the atmosphere.

Toxicity 

Carbon dioxide content in fresh air (averaged between sea-level and 10 kPa level, i.e., about  altitude) varies between 0.036% (360 ppm) and 0.041% (412 ppm), depending on the location.

CO2 is an asphyxiant gas and not classified as toxic or harmful in accordance with Globally Harmonized System of Classification and Labelling of Chemicals standards of United Nations Economic Commission for Europe by using the OECD Guidelines for the Testing of Chemicals. In concentrations up to 1% (10,000 ppm), it will make some people feel drowsy and give the lungs a stuffy feeling. Concentrations of 7% to 10% (70,000 to 100,000 ppm) may cause suffocation, even in the presence of sufficient oxygen, manifesting as dizziness, headache, visual and hearing dysfunction, and unconsciousness within a few minutes to an hour. The physiological effects of acute carbon dioxide exposure are grouped together under the term hypercapnia, a subset of asphyxiation.

Because it is heavier than air, in locations where the gas seeps from the ground (due to sub-surface volcanic or geothermal activity) in relatively high concentrations, without the dispersing effects of wind, it can collect in sheltered/pocketed locations below average ground level, causing animals located therein to be suffocated. Carrion feeders attracted to the carcasses are then also killed. Children have been killed in the same way near the city of Goma by CO2 emissions from the nearby volcano Mount Nyiragongo.

Adaptation to increased concentrations of CO2 occurs in humans, including modified breathing and kidney bicarbonate production, in order to balance the effects of blood acidification (acidosis). Several studies suggested that 2.0 percent inspired concentrations could be used for closed air spaces (e.g. a submarine) since the adaptation is physiological and reversible, as deterioration in performance or in normal physical activity does not happen at this level of exposure for five days. Yet, other studies show a decrease in cognitive function even at much lower levels. Also, with ongoing respiratory acidosis, adaptation or compensatory mechanisms will be unable to reverse such condition.

Below 1% 
There are few studies of the health effects of long-term continuous CO2 exposure on humans and animals at levels below 1%. Occupational CO2 exposure limits have been set in the United States at 0.5% (5000 ppm) for an eight-hour period. At this CO2 concentration, International Space Station crew experienced headaches, lethargy, mental slowness, emotional irritation, and sleep disruption. Studies in animals at 0.5% CO2 have demonstrated kidney calcification and bone loss after eight weeks of exposure. A study of humans exposed in 2.5 hour sessions demonstrated significant negative effects on cognitive abilities at concentrations as low as 0.1% (1000ppm) CO2 likely due to CO2 induced increases in cerebral blood flow. Another study observed a decline in basic activity level and information usage at 1000 ppm, when compared to 500 ppm. However a review of the literature found that most studies on the phenomenon of carbon dioxide induced cognitive impairment to have a small effect on high-level decision making and most of the studies were confounded by inadequate study designs, environmental comfort, uncertainties in exposure doses and differing cognitive assessments used. Similarly a study on the effects of the concentration of CO2 in motorcycle helmets has been criticized for having dubious methodology in not noting the self-reports of motorcycle riders and taking measurements using mannequins. Further when normal motorcycle conditions were achieved (such as highway or city speeds) or the visor was raised the concentration of CO2 declined to safe levels (0.2%).

Ventilation 

Poor ventilation is one of the main causes of excessive CO2 concentrations in closed spaces, leading to poor indoor air quality. Carbon dioxide differential above outdoor concentrations at steady state conditions (when the occupancy and ventilation system operation are sufficiently long that CO2 concentration has stabilized) are sometimes used to estimate ventilation rates per person. Higher CO2 concentrations are associated with occupant health, comfort and performance degradation. ASHRAE Standard 62.1–2007 ventilation rates may result in indoor concentrations up to 2,100 ppm above ambient outdoor conditions. Thus if the outdoor concentration is 400 ppm, indoor concentrations may reach 2,500 ppm with ventilation rates that meet this industry consensus standard. Concentrations in poorly ventilated spaces can be found even higher than this (range of 3,000 or 4,000 ppm).

Miners, who are particularly vulnerable to gas exposure due to insufficient ventilation, referred to mixtures of carbon dioxide and nitrogen as "blackdamp", "choke damp" or "stythe". Before more effective technologies were developed, miners would frequently monitor for dangerous levels of blackdamp and other gases in mine shafts by bringing a caged canary with them as they worked. The canary is more sensitive to asphyxiant gases than humans, and as it became unconscious would stop singing and fall off its perch. The Davy lamp could also detect high levels of blackdamp (which sinks, and collects near the floor) by burning less brightly, while methane, another suffocating gas and explosion risk, would make the lamp burn more brightly.

In February 2020, three people died from suffocation at a party in Moscow when dry ice (frozen CO2) was added to a swimming pool to cool it down. A similar accident occurred in 2018 when a woman died from CO2 fumes emanating from the large amount of dry ice she was transporting in her car.

Outdoor areas with elevated concentrations 
Local concentrations of carbon dioxide can reach high values near strong sources, especially those that are isolated by surrounding terrain. After sunrise the gas is dispersed by convection. High concentrations of CO2 produced by disturbance of deep lake water saturated with CO2 are thought to have caused 37 fatalities at Lake Monoun, Cameroon in 1984 and 1700 casualties at Lake Nyos, Cameroon in 1986.

Human physiology

Content 

In humans, this carbon dioxide is carried through the venous system and is breathed out through the lungs, resulting in lower concentrations in the arteries. The carbon dioxide content of the blood is often given as the partial pressure, which is the pressure which carbon dioxide would have had if it alone occupied the volume. In humans, the blood carbon dioxide contents is shown in the adjacent table.

Transport in the blood 
CO2 is carried in blood in three different ways. (Exact percentages vary between arterial and venous blood).
 Majority (about 70% to 80%) is converted to bicarbonate ions  by the enzyme carbonic anhydrase in the red blood cells, by the reaction .
 5–10% is dissolved in blood plasma
 5–10% is bound to hemoglobin as carbamino compounds

Hemoglobin, the main oxygen-carrying molecule in red blood cells, carries both oxygen and carbon dioxide. However, the CO2 bound to hemoglobin does not bind to the same site as oxygen. Instead, it combines with the N-terminal groups on the four globin chains. However, because of allosteric effects on the hemoglobin molecule, the binding of CO2 decreases the amount of oxygen that is bound for a given partial pressure of oxygen. This is known as the Haldane Effect, and is important in the transport of carbon dioxide from the tissues to the lungs. Conversely, a rise in the partial pressure of CO2 or a lower pH will cause offloading of oxygen from hemoglobin, which is known as the Bohr effect.

Regulation of respiration 
Carbon dioxide is one of the mediators of local autoregulation of blood supply. If its concentration is high, the capillaries expand to allow a greater blood flow to that tissue.

Bicarbonate ions are crucial for regulating blood pH. A person's breathing rate influences the level of CO2 in their blood. Breathing that is too slow or shallow causes respiratory acidosis, while breathing that is too rapid leads to hyperventilation, which can cause respiratory alkalosis.

Although the body requires oxygen for metabolism, low oxygen levels normally do not stimulate breathing. Rather, breathing is stimulated by higher carbon dioxide levels. As a result, breathing low-pressure air or a gas mixture with no oxygen at all (such as pure nitrogen) can lead to loss of consciousness without ever experiencing air hunger. This is especially perilous for high-altitude fighter pilots. It is also why flight attendants instruct passengers, in case of loss of cabin pressure, to apply the oxygen mask to themselves first before helping others; otherwise, one risks losing consciousness.

The respiratory centers try to maintain an arterial CO2 pressure of 40 mm Hg. With intentional hyperventilation, the CO2 content of arterial blood may be lowered to 10–20 mm Hg (the oxygen content of the blood is little affected), and the respiratory drive is diminished. This is why one can hold one's breath longer after hyperventilating than without hyperventilating. This carries the risk that unconsciousness may result before the need to breathe becomes overwhelming, which is why hyperventilation is particularly dangerous before free diving.

Concentrations and role in the environment

Atmosphere

Oceans

Ocean acidification 

Carbon dioxide dissolves in the ocean to form carbonic acid (H2CO3), bicarbonate (HCO3−) and carbonate (CO32−). There is about fifty times as much carbon dioxide dissolved in the oceans as exists in the atmosphere. The oceans act as an enormous carbon sink, and have taken up about a third of CO2 emitted by human activity.

Hydrothermal vents 
Carbon dioxide is also introduced into the oceans through hydrothermal vents. The Champagne hydrothermal vent, found at the Northwest Eifuku volcano in the Mariana Trench, produces almost pure liquid carbon dioxide, one of only two known sites in the world as of 2004, the other being in the Okinawa Trough. The finding of a submarine lake of liquid carbon dioxide in the Okinawa Trough was reported in 2006.

Production

Biological processes 
Carbon dioxide is a by-product of the fermentation of sugar in the brewing of beer, whisky and other alcoholic beverages and in the production of bioethanol. Yeast metabolizes sugar to produce  and ethanol, also known as alcohol, as follows:
 C6H12O6 -> 2 CO2 + 2 C2H5OH

All aerobic organisms produce  when they oxidize carbohydrates, fatty acids, and proteins. The large number of reactions involved are exceedingly complex and not described easily. Refer to (cellular respiration, anaerobic respiration and photosynthesis). The equation for the respiration of glucose and other monosaccharides is:
 C6H12O6 + 6 O2 -> 6 CO2 + 6 H2O

Anaerobic organisms decompose organic material producing methane and carbon dioxide together with traces of other compounds. Regardless of the type of organic material, the production of gases follows well defined kinetic pattern. Carbon dioxide comprises about 40–45% of the gas that emanates from decomposition in landfills (termed "landfill gas"). Most of the remaining 50–55% is methane.

Industrial processes 
Carbon dioxide can be obtained by distillation from air, but the method is inefficient. Industrially, carbon dioxide is predominantly an unrecovered waste product, produced by several methods which may be practiced at various scales.

Combustion 
The combustion of all carbon-based fuels, such as methane (natural gas), petroleum distillates (gasoline, diesel, kerosene, propane), coal, wood and generic organic matter produces carbon dioxide and, except in the case of pure carbon, water. As an example, the chemical reaction between methane and oxygen:
 CH4 + 2 O2-> CO2 + 2 H2O

Iron is reduced from its oxides with coke in a blast furnace, producing pig iron and carbon dioxide:
 Fe2O3 + 3 CO -> 3 CO2 + 2 Fe

By-product from hydrogen production 
Carbon dioxide is a byproduct of the industrial production of hydrogen by steam reforming and the water gas shift reaction in ammonia production. These processes begin with the reaction of water and natural gas (mainly methane). This is a major source of food-grade carbon dioxide for use in carbonation of beer and soft drinks, and is also used for stunning animals such as poultry. In the summer of 2018 a shortage of carbon dioxide for these purposes arose in Europe due to the temporary shut-down of several ammonia plants for maintenance.

Thermal decomposition of limestone 
 CaCO3 -> CaO + CO2

Acids liberate  from most metal carbonates. Consequently, it may be obtained directly from natural carbon dioxide springs, where it is produced by the action of acidified water on limestone or dolomite. The reaction between hydrochloric acid and calcium carbonate (limestone or chalk) is shown below:
CaCO3 + 2HCl -> CaCl2 + H2CO3

The carbonic acid then decomposes to water and :
H2CO3 -> CO2 + H2O

Such reactions are accompanied by foaming or bubbling, or both, as the gas is released. They have widespread uses in industry because they can be used to neutralize waste acid streams.

Commercial uses 
Carbon dioxide is used by the food industry, the oil industry, and the chemical industry.
The compound has varied commercial uses but one of its greatest uses as a chemical is in the production of carbonated beverages; it provides the sparkle in carbonated beverages such as soda water, beer and sparkling wine.

Precursor to chemicals 

In the chemical industry, carbon dioxide is mainly consumed as an ingredient in the production of urea, with a smaller fraction being used to produce methanol and a range of other products. Some carboxylic acid derivatives such as sodium salicylate are prepared using CO2 by the Kolbe–Schmitt reaction.

In addition to conventional processes using CO2 for chemical production, electrochemical methods are also being explored at a research level. In particular, the use of renewable energy for production of fuels from CO2 (such as methanol) is attractive as this could result in fuels that could be easily transported and used within conventional combustion technologies but have no net CO2 emissions.

Agriculture 
Plants require carbon dioxide to conduct photosynthesis. The atmospheres of greenhouses may (if of large size, must) be enriched with additional CO2 to sustain and increase the rate of plant growth. At very high concentrations (100 times atmospheric concentration, or greater), carbon dioxide can be toxic to animal life, so raising the concentration to 10,000 ppm (1%) or higher for several hours will eliminate pests such as whiteflies and spider mites in a greenhouse.

Foods 

Carbon dioxide is a food additive used as a propellant and acidity regulator in the food industry. It is approved for usage in the EU (listed as E number E290), US and Australia and New Zealand (listed by its INS number 290).

When placed in the mouth, it dissolves (just like other hard candy) and releases the gas bubbles with an audible pop.

Leavening agents cause dough to rise by producing carbon dioxide. Baker's yeast produces carbon dioxide by fermentation of sugars within the dough, while chemical leaveners such as baking powder and baking soda release carbon dioxide when heated or if exposed to acids.

Beverages 
Carbon dioxide is used to produce carbonated soft drinks and soda water. Traditionally, the carbonation of beer and sparkling wine came about through natural fermentation, but many manufacturers carbonate these drinks with carbon dioxide recovered from the fermentation process. In the case of bottled and kegged beer, the most common method used is carbonation with recycled carbon dioxide. With the exception of British real ale, draught beer is usually transferred from kegs in a cold room or cellar to dispensing taps on the bar using pressurized carbon dioxide, sometimes mixed with nitrogen.

The taste of soda water (and related taste sensations in other carbonated beverages) is an effect of the dissolved carbon dioxide rather than the bursting bubbles of the gas. Carbonic anhydrase 4 converts to carbonic acid leading to a sour taste, and also the dissolved carbon dioxide induces a somatosensory response.

Winemaking 

Carbon dioxide in the form of dry ice is often used during the cold soak phase in winemaking to cool clusters of grapes quickly after picking to help prevent spontaneous fermentation by wild yeast. The main advantage of using dry ice over water ice is that it cools the grapes without adding any additional water that might decrease the sugar concentration in the grape must, and thus the alcohol concentration in the finished wine. Carbon dioxide is also used to create a hypoxic environment for carbonic maceration, the process used to produce Beaujolais wine.

Carbon dioxide is sometimes used to top up wine bottles or other storage vessels such as barrels to prevent oxidation, though it has the problem that it can dissolve into the wine, making a previously still wine slightly fizzy. For this reason, other gases such as nitrogen or argon are preferred for this process by professional wine makers.

Stunning animals
Carbon dioxide is often used to "stun" animals before slaughter. "Stunning" may be a misnomer, as the animals are not knocked out immediately and may suffer distress.

Inert gas 
Carbon dioxide is one of the most commonly used compressed gases for pneumatic (pressurized gas) systems in portable pressure tools. Carbon dioxide is also used as an atmosphere for welding, although in the welding arc, it reacts to oxidize most metals. Use in the automotive industry is common despite significant evidence that welds made in carbon dioxide are more brittle than those made in more inert atmospheres. When used for MIG welding, CO2 use is sometimes referred to as MAG welding, for Metal Active Gas, as CO2 can react at these high temperatures. It tends to produce a hotter puddle than truly inert atmospheres, improving the flow characteristics. Although, this may be due to atmospheric reactions occurring at the puddle site. This is usually the opposite of the desired effect when welding, as it tends to embrittle the site, but may not be a problem for general mild steel welding, where ultimate ductility is not a major concern.

Life jackets often contain canisters of pressured carbon dioxide for quick inflation. Aluminium capsules of CO2 are also sold as supplies of compressed gas for air guns, paintball markers/guns, inflating bicycle tires, and for making carbonated water. High concentrations of carbon dioxide can also be used to kill pests. Liquid carbon dioxide is used in supercritical drying of some food products and technological materials, in the preparation of specimens for scanning electron microscopy and in the decaffeination of coffee beans.

Fire extinguisher 

Carbon dioxide can be used to extinguish flames by flooding the environment around the flame with the gas. It does not itself react to extinguish the flame, but starves the flame of oxygen by displacing it. Some fire extinguishers, especially those designed for electrical fires, contain liquid carbon dioxide under pressure. Carbon dioxide extinguishers work well on small flammable liquid and electrical fires, but not on ordinary combustible fires, because they do not cool the burning substances significantly, and when the carbon dioxide disperses, they can catch fire upon exposure to atmospheric oxygen. They are mainly used in server rooms.

Carbon dioxide has also been widely used as an extinguishing agent in fixed fire-protection systems for local application of specific hazards and total flooding of a protected space. International Maritime Organization standards recognize carbon-dioxide systems for fire protection of ship holds and engine rooms. Carbon-dioxide-based fire-protection systems have been linked to several deaths, because it can cause suffocation in sufficiently high concentrations. A review of CO2 systems identified 51 incidents between 1975 and the date of the report (2000), causing 72 deaths and 145 injuries.

Supercritical CO2 as solvent 

Liquid carbon dioxide is a good solvent for many lipophilic organic compounds and is used to remove caffeine from coffee. Carbon dioxide has attracted attention in the pharmaceutical and other chemical processing industries as a less toxic alternative to more traditional solvents such as organochlorides. It is also used by some dry cleaners for this reason. It is used in the preparation of some aerogels because of the properties of supercritical carbon dioxide.

Medical and pharmacological uses 
In medicine, up to 5% carbon dioxide (130 times atmospheric concentration) is added to oxygen for stimulation of breathing after apnea and to stabilize the / balance in blood.

Carbon dioxide can be mixed with up to 50% oxygen, forming an inhalable gas; this is known as Carbogen and has a variety of medical and research uses.

Another medical use are the mofette, dry spas that use carbon dioxide from post-volcanic discharge for therapeutic purposes.

Energy 

Supercritical CO2 is used as the working fluid in the Allam power cycle engine.

Fossil fuel recovery 
Carbon dioxide is used in enhanced oil recovery where it is injected into or adjacent to producing oil wells, usually under supercritical conditions, when it becomes miscible with the oil. This approach can increase original oil recovery by reducing residual oil saturation by 7–23% additional to primary extraction. It acts as both a pressurizing agent and, when dissolved into the underground crude oil, significantly reduces its viscosity, and changing surface chemistry enabling the oil to flow more rapidly through the reservoir to the removal well. In mature oil fields, extensive pipe networks are used to carry the carbon dioxide to the injection points.

In enhanced coal bed methane recovery, carbon dioxide would be pumped into the coal seam to displace methane, as opposed to current methods which primarily rely on the removal of water (to reduce pressure) to make the coal seam release its trapped methane.

Bio transformation into fuel 

It has been proposed that CO2 from power generation be bubbled into ponds to stimulate growth of algae that could then be converted into biodiesel fuel. A strain of the cyanobacterium Synechococcus elongatus has been genetically engineered to produce the fuels isobutyraldehyde and isobutanol from CO2 using photosynthesis.

Researchers have developed a process called electrolysis, using enzymes isolated from bacteria to power the chemical reactions which convert CO2 into fuels.

Refrigerant 

Liquid and solid carbon dioxide are important refrigerants, especially in the food industry, where they are employed during the transportation and storage of ice cream and other frozen foods. Solid carbon dioxide is called "dry ice" and is used for small shipments where refrigeration equipment is not practical. Solid carbon dioxide is always below  at regular atmospheric pressure, regardless of the air temperature.

 Liquid carbon dioxide (industry nomenclature R744 or R-744) was used as a refrigerant prior to the use of dichlorodifluoromethane (R12, a chlorofluorocarbon (CFC) compound).  might enjoy a renaissance because one of the main substitutes to CFCs, 1,1,1,2-tetrafluoroethane (R134a, a hydrofluorocarbon (HFC) compound) contributes to climate change more than  does.  physical properties are highly favorable for cooling, refrigeration, and heating purposes, having a high volumetric cooling capacity. In automobile air conditioning, in more than 90% of all driving conditions for latitudes higher than 50°,  (R744) operates more efficiently than systems using HFCs (e.g., R134a). Its environmental advantages (GWP of 1, non-ozone depleting, non-toxic, non-flammable) could make it the future working fluid to replace current HFCs in cars, supermarkets, and heat pump water heaters, among others. Coca-Cola has fielded -based beverage coolers and the U.S. Army is interested in  refrigeration and heating technology.

Minor uses 

Carbon dioxide is the lasing medium in a carbon-dioxide laser, which is one of the earliest type of lasers.

Carbon dioxide can be used as a means of controlling the pH of swimming pools, by continuously adding gas to the water, thus keeping the pH from rising. Among the advantages of this is the avoidance of handling (more hazardous) acids. Similarly, it is also used in the maintaining reef aquaria, where it is commonly used in calcium reactors to temporarily lower the pH of water being passed over calcium carbonate in order to allow the calcium carbonate to dissolve into the water more freely, where it is used by some corals to build their skeleton.

Used as the primary coolant in the British advanced gas-cooled reactor for nuclear power generation.

Carbon dioxide induction is commonly used for the euthanasia of laboratory research animals. Methods to administer CO2 include placing animals directly into a closed, prefilled chamber containing CO2, or exposure to a gradually increasing concentration of CO2. The American Veterinary Medical Association's 2020 guidelines for carbon dioxide induction state that a displacement rate of 30–70% of the chamber or cage volume per minute is optimal for the humane euthanasia of small rodents. Percentages of CO2 vary for different species, based on identified optimal percentages to minimize distress.

Carbon dioxide is also used in several related cleaning and surface-preparation techniques.

History of discovery 

Carbon dioxide was the first gas to be described as a discrete substance. In about 1640, the Flemish chemist Jan Baptist van Helmont observed that when he burned charcoal in a closed vessel, the mass of the resulting ash was much less than that of the original charcoal. His interpretation was that the rest of the charcoal had been transmuted into an invisible substance he termed a "gas" or "wild spirit" (spiritus sylvestris).

The properties of carbon dioxide were further studied in the 1750s by the Scottish physician Joseph Black. He found that limestone (calcium carbonate) could be heated or treated with acids to yield a gas he called "fixed air". He observed that the fixed air was denser than air and supported neither flame nor animal life. Black also found that when bubbled through limewater (a saturated aqueous solution of calcium hydroxide), it would precipitate calcium carbonate. He used this phenomenon to illustrate that carbon dioxide is produced by animal respiration and microbial fermentation. In 1772, English chemist Joseph Priestley published a paper entitled Impregnating Water with Fixed Air in which he described a process of dripping sulfuric acid (or oil of vitriol as Priestley knew it) on chalk in order to produce carbon dioxide, and forcing the gas to dissolve by agitating a bowl of water in contact with the gas.

Carbon dioxide was first liquefied (at elevated pressures) in 1823 by Humphry Davy and Michael Faraday. The earliest description of solid carbon dioxide (dry ice) was given by the French inventor Adrien-Jean-Pierre Thilorier, who in 1835 opened a pressurized container of liquid carbon dioxide, only to find that the cooling produced by the rapid evaporation of the liquid yielded a "snow" of solid CO2.

See also 

 
 
  (from the atmosphere)
 List of least carbon efficient power stations
 List of countries by carbon dioxide emissions
 
  (early work on CO2 and climate change)
 
 NASA's

References

External links 

 Current global map of carbon dioxide concentration
 CDC – NIOSH Pocket Guide to Chemical Hazards – Carbon Dioxide
 Trends in Atmospheric Carbon Dioxide (NOAA)

 
Acid anhydrides
Acidic oxides
Coolants
Fire suppression agents
Greenhouse gases
Household chemicals
Inorganic solvents
Laser gain media
Nuclear reactor coolants
Oxocarbons
Propellants
Refrigerants
Gaseous signaling molecules
E-number additives
Triatomic molecules